| tries = {{#expr:
 + 9 + 7 + 6 + 10 + 8 + 4 + 10
 + 10 + 8 + 8 + 8 + 8 + 9 + 9
 + 8 + 8 + 9 + 8 + 6 + 13 + 8
 + 10 + 8 + 7 + 13 + 9 + 8 + 8
 + 8 + 4 + 11 + 7 + 11 + 9 + 9 
 + 7 + 7 + 8 + 9 + 7 + 7 + 8 
 + 10 + 8 + 8 + 8 + 5 + 8 + 7 
 + 7 + 8 + 9 + 9 + 9 + 11 + 7 
 + 10 + 3 + 7 + 9 + 8 + 8 + 13
 + 6 + 8 + 8 + 8 + 10 + 8 + 8 
 + 9 + 4 + 7 + 11 + 9 + 2 + 4 
 + 7 + 8 + 8 + 8 + 8 + 7 + 5 
 + 4 + 7 + 6 + 7 
 + 11 + 5 + 6 
 + 9 + 12 + 3 + 7 + 5 + 5 + 6 
 + 5 + 4 + 8 + 9 + 10 + 6 + 7
 + 8 + 3 + 8 
 + 5 + 5 + 6 + 8 + 9 + 8 + 8 
 + 12 + 9 + 11 + 10 + 10 
 + 13 + 10 + 10 + 11
 + 9 + 11 + 12 + 8 + 6 + 5 + 5 
 + 12 + 7 + 14 + 6 + 12 + 7 + 7 
 + 9 + 8 + 5 + 7 + 6 + 12 + 11 
 + 7 + 7 + 6 + 7 + 8
 + 7 + 9

}}
| top point scorer = 222 – Sam Morley (Esher) 

| top try scorer   = 24 – Nana Asiedu (Cambridge)
| prevseason       = 2021–22
| nextseason       = 2023–24
}}

2022–23 National League 1 is the 35th season of the third tier of the English domestic rugby union competitions, and following a reorganisation of the league structure, it is reverting to a 14-team format.

The reigning champions entering the season are Caldy who were crowned champions on 23 April 2022, following their final match of the season at home to runner-up Sale; beating them 13–9 in front of a club record attendance of 3,023. They were promoted to the RFU Championship. Blackheath (14th position) and Tonbridge Juddians (15th) were relegated to National League 2 East.

Structure
The league consists of fourteen teams, with all the teams playing each other on a home and away basis, to make a total of twenty-six matches each. There is one promotion place, with the champions promoted to the RFU Championship, and there are three relegation places to either, National League 2 East, National League 2 North or National League 2 West, depending on the geographical location of the team. 

The results of the matches contribute points to the league table as follows:
 4 points are awarded for a win
 2 points are awarded for a draw
 0 points are awarded for a loss, however
 1 losing (bonus) point is awarded to a team that loses a match by 7 points or fewer
 1 additional (bonus) point is awarded to a team scoring 4 tries or more in a match.

Participating teams and locations

League table

Fixtures & results
Fixtures for the season were announced by the RFU on 13 June 2022.

Round 1

Round 2

Round 3

Round 4

Round 5

Round 6

Round 7

Round 8

Round 9

Round 10

Round 11

Round 12

Round 13

Round 14

Round 15

Round 16

Round 17

Round 18

Rescheduled matches

Rescheduled matches (Round 14)

Round 19

Round 20

Round 21

Round 22

Rescheduled matches

Notes

References

External links
 NCA Rugby

3
National League 1 seasons
3